The Dermacoccaceae is a family of bacteria placed within the order of Micrococcales.
Bacteria af this familia are Gram-positive, non-spore-forming and non-motile. Dermacoccaceae bacteria occur on the skin.

Phylogeny
The currently accepted taxonomy is based on the List of Prokaryotic names with Standing in Nomenclature and the phylogeny is based on whole-genome sequences.

Notes

References

Further reading 
 

 

Micrococcales